The 2013 1000 Guineas Stakes was a horse race held at Newmarket Racecourse on Sunday 5 May 2013. It was the 200th running of the 1000 Guineas.

The winner was Ben Keswick's Sky Lantern, a three-year-old grey filly trained at East Everleigh in Wiltshire by Richard Hannon Sr. and ridden by Richard Hughes. Sky Lantern's victory was the first in the race for her owner, trainer and jockey.

The contenders
The race attracted a field of fifteen runners, ten trained in the United Kingdom, three in Ireland and two in France. The favourite was the Henry Cecil-trained Hot Snap, who had won the Nell Gwyn Stakes by two and a quarter lengths on 17 April. Sky Lantern, the runner-up in the Nell Gwyn Stakes had won the Moyglare Stud Stakes in Ireland in 2012. The French challenge was led by What A Name, who had won the Prix La Rochette and finished second in the Grand Critérium as a two-year-old before winning the Prix Imprudence on her three-year-old debut. The Irish runners were Moth and Snow Queen from Aidan O'Brien's Ballydoyle stable and the Dermot Weld-trained Rasmeyaa. The other contenders included Maureen, who had won the Fred Darling Stakes from Agent Allison, the Prestige Stakes winner Ollie Olga and Winning Express, runner-up in the Cheveley Park Stakes. Hot Snap headed the betting at odds of 5/2 ahead of What A Name (7/2) and Just The Judge (7/1) with Sky Lantern and Moth on 9/1.

The race
The 100/1 outsider Masarah broke quickly and set the pace from Celtic Filly, Winning Express, Rasmeyaa and Just The Judge. Instead of splitting into groups on the wide Newmarket course, the runner clustered and raced down the middle of the track. Winning Express moved to the front approaching the final quarter mile but was soon challenged by Just The Judge as the favourite Hot Snap began to struggle and Sky Lantern began to make rapid progress. Just The Judge took the advantage inside the final furlong and looked likely to win but was caught fifty yards from the finish by Sky Lantern, who won by half a length. Moth, who had been hampered when attempting to make her challenge, finished strongly to take third place by a nose from Winning Express. Of the other fancied runners, Maureen finished sixth, What A Name seventh, and Hot Snap ninth.

Race details
 Sponsor: QIPCO
 First prize: £241,586
 Surface: Turf
 Going: Good to Firm
 Distance: 8 furlongs
 Number of runners: 15
 Winner's time: 1:36.38

Full result

 Abbreviations: nse = nose; nk = neck; shd = head; hd = head; dist = distance; UR = unseated rider

Winner's details
Further details of the winner, Sky Lantern
 Foaled: 27 January 2010
 Country: Ireland
 Sire: Red Clubs; Dam: Shawanni (Shareef Dancer)
 Owner: Ben Keswick
 Breeder: Tally-Ho Stud

References

1000 Guineas
 2013
1000 Guineas
1000 Guineas
2010s in Suffolk